The red-tailed comet (Sappho sparganurus) is a medium-sized hummingbird belonging to the family Trochilidae. It is the only species placed in the genus Sappho.

Taxonomy
The red-tailed comet was formally described in 1812 by the English naturalist George Shaw under the binomial name Trochilus sparganurus. The type locality is Bolivia. The red-tailed comet is now the only species placed in the genus Sappho that was introduced in 1849 by the German naturalist Ludwig Reichenbach. The genus name refers to Sappho, an ancient Greek poet of Lesbos. The species name sparganurus combines the Ancient Greek σπαργανόω/spargaō meaning 'to wrap' and ουρά/oura meaning 'tail'.

Two subspecies are recognised:
 S. s. sparganurus (Shaw, 1812) – north, central Bolivia
 S. s. sapho (Lesson, R, 1828) – south Bolivia, north, west Argentina and east-central Chile

In at least part of its range it is known in the local Quechua language as Q'ori Kenti (lit. 'golden hummingbird'). It is called the picaflor cometa in Spanish.

Description
The red-tailed comet is one of the largest hummingbirds, and males reaching a length of 22 cm, females up to 15 cm. The plumage of males is largely green, with a shining gorget. The head is green, while the back and rump are reddish violet. The male has a deeply forked, spectacular, long, iridescent, golden-reddish tail, longer than the length of the body, while the female has a shorter reddish-bronze tail. The species has a hoarse chattery call.

Distribution and habitat
This species can be found in the central Andes of Bolivia and Argentina, in Chile and in Peru.

Common to frequent in the woodlands and scrub typical of the dry Interandean valles extended up into Polylepis forests, and into the shrubby transition zones to high elevation puna or the moister cloud forests. These hummingbirds live in arid scrub with cacti and Prosopis trees and in deciduous forests with Alnus and Podocarpus. It is frequently found around human habitation in agricultural areas, cities and towns.

Gallery

References

Further reading

 del Hoyo, J., Collar, N.J., Christie, D.A., Elliott, A. and Fishpool, L.D.C. 2014. HBW and BirdLife International Illustrated Checklist of the Birds of the World. Lynx Edicions BirdLife International.
 Javier González Zapata: Sobre la presencia en Chile de Sappho sparganura sappho (Lesson) (Aves: Trochilidae). In: Boletín Ornitológico. Bd. 9, Nr. 1/2, 1977, S. 10–11
 Jon Fjeldså, Niels Krabbe: Birds of the High Andes: A Manual to the Birds of the Temperate Zone of the Andes and Patagonia, South America. Apollo Books, Stenstrup 1990, .

red-tailed comet
Birds of the Bolivian Andes
Birds of the Gran Chaco
Hummingbird species of South America
red-tailed comet